The Berkeley Institute is a public senior high school in Pembroke Parish, Bermuda. As of 2016, it had about 500 students.

The school was established in 1897. It was originally located in the Samaritan's Hall, but in 1902 it moved to its current location. It is one of two public senior schools in the territory.

References

External links
 

Secondary schools in Bermuda
Pembroke Parish
Educational institutions established in 1897
1897 establishments in the British Empire